Ryan Richter (born April 12, 1989) is an American former professional soccer player and current assistant coach for Philadelphia Union in MLS.

Youth and college
Richter played soccer at William Tennent High School in Warminster, Pennsylvania where he was a three-year starter. He was elected as team captain and MVP for both his Junior and Senior years. At William Tennent, Richter attained honor roll status for all four years, he was also a three-year starter on the basketball team as well as being a placekicker on the football team.

After high school, Richter attended La Salle University in Philadelphia, Pennsylvania where he continued to play soccer. At La Salle, he was named Atlantic 10 Offensive Player of the Year, and Student-Athlete of the Year for the 2010 season. He was also named Atlantic 10 Sportsman of the Year in 2010 as well as First-Team Scholar All America.  Richter was named Philadelphia Soccer Six Player of the Year in 2009 and 2010, leading the city in points and goals both years. He is the second player from the La Salle Explorers to be drafted into the MLS after Cesidio Colasante. Richter racked up 28 goals and 13 assists during his time with the Explorers.

During his college years, Richter played for the Ocean City Nor'easters in the USL Premier Development League.

Club career
On January 18, 2011, Richter was drafted as the 5th overall  pick in the 1st round of the 2011 MLS Supplemental Draft by  Philadelphia Union. After a successful preseason trial, he signed with the club on March 1, 2011.

Richter was sent on a one-game loan to the Union's USL Pro affiliate Harrisburg City Islanders in June 2011; he made his professional debut for them on June 4, in a game against Charleston Battery.
On July 21, 2011, Richter made his Union debut against Everton

On August 24, 2011 Richter scored his first career goal for the Philadelphia Union against the Harrisburg City Islanders. The goal, assisted by Justin Mapp, came in the 49th minute.

On January 19, 2012, Philadelphia declined his 2012 contract option and Richter was released.

Richter trialled with D.C. United during February and March 2012.

Charleston Battery
Richter signed with USL Pro team Charleston Battery on March 27, 2012.
In 2012, Richter helped the Charleston Battery capture the 2012 USL PRO Championship.

Toronto FC
He signed with Toronto FC on March 25, 2013. Richter made his debut for Toronto on April 13, in a 1–1 draw against Philadelphia, he came on as a first half sub for Darel Russell who sustained an injury.

After spending most of the 2014 season on loan with NASL club Ottawa Fury FC, Richter joined them permanently on January 28, 2015.

Bethlehem Steel FC
In 2016, Richter was transferred back to the Philadelphia Union organization to play for the newly formed USL club, Bethlehem Steel FC. Richter would be named the team's first captain, and would go on to be joint leading goal scorer for the 2016 season. Prior to the season's end, Richter was transferred to NASL club New York Cosmos.

New York Cosmos
Richter made his debut for the Cosmos in a 0–2 victory over the Carolina Railhawks.

Coaching career
Following the 2017 season, Richter retired from the professional game to help coach the Philadelphia Union academy. In January 2022, Richter was promoted to assistant coach to Jim Curtin with the Philadelphia Union first team.

Honors

Ottawa Fury 

 NASL Fall Championship 2015

Notes
A.  The club was known as the Ocean City Barons through 2009.

References

External links
 La Salle bio
 

1989 births
Living people
American soccer players
American expatriate soccer players
La Salle Explorers men's soccer players
Ocean City Nor'easters players
Philadelphia Union players
Penn FC players
Charleston Battery players
Toronto FC players
Ottawa Fury FC players
Philadelphia Union II players
New York Cosmos (2010) players
Association football defenders
Soccer players from Pennsylvania
Expatriate soccer players in Canada
Philadelphia Union draft picks
USL League Two players
USL Championship players
Major League Soccer players
North American Soccer League players